Tore Cervin (born 2 August 1950 in Malmö) is a former Swedish footballer.

Honours

Club
Malmö FF
Allsvenskan: 1974, 1975, 1977
Svenska Cupen: 1972-73, 1973-74, 1974-75, 1977-78, 1979-80

References

1950 births
Living people
Swedish footballers
Swedish expatriate footballers
Sweden international footballers
Malmö FF players
Toronto Blizzard (1971–1984) players
IF Limhamn Bunkeflo (men) players
Helsingborgs IF players
Allsvenskan players
North American Soccer League (1968–1984) players
North American Soccer League (1968–1984) indoor players
Expatriate soccer players in Canada
Swedish expatriate sportspeople in Canada

Association football forwards
Footballers from Malmö